Bustillo del Páramo (Leonese: Bustiellu'l Páramu) is a municipality located in the province of León, Castile and León, Spain. According to the 2010 census (INE), the municipality has a population of 1,484 inhabitants.

Villages
Acebes del Páramo
Antoñanes del Páramo
Barrio de Buenos Aires
Bustillo del Páramo
Grisuela del Páramo
Matalobos del Páramo
La Milla del Páramo
San Pedro de Pegas

References

Municipalities in the Province of León